was a Japanese samurai daimyō of the early Edo period.

Early life

He married Kamehime, daughter of Honda Tadamasa with Kamehime (daughter of Matsudaira Nobuyasu) and adopted daughter of Tokugawa Ieyasu.

Daimyo
Following the deaths of his father and elder brother in the Osaka Summer Campaign, his holdings were transferred from Akashi Domain (100,000 koku) in Harima Province to the Kokura Domain (150,000 koku) Buzen Province.

Famed as the lord who employed Miyamoto Musashi's adopted son Iori, Tadazane took part in the Shogunate's campaign to quell the Shimabara Rebellion, where the Kokura forces assisted in the execution of survivors of the rebel force, predominantly Christians.

Tadazane's son Tadataka succeeded him. Other children included Nagayasu, Naganobu, Sanekata, and three daughters (one of them adopted from the Hachisuka clan of Tokushima-han).

See also
 Ogasawara clan

References

|-

|-

Ogasawara clan
1596 births
1667 deaths
Fudai daimyo